La Florida Airport  is an airport serving the Pacific coast city of Tumaco in the Nariño Department of Colombia. The airport is on an island connected to the mainland through a series of bridges.

The Tumaco non-directional beacon (Ident: TCO) and Tumaco VOR-DME (Ident: TCO) are located on the field.

Airlines and destinations

See also
Transport in Colombia
List of airports in Colombia

References

External links
OpenStreetMap - La Florida
OurAirports - La Florida
SkyVector - La Florida
FallingRain - La Florida Airport

Airports in Colombia
Buildings and structures in Nariño Department